Vienna International School (VIS) is a non-profit international school in Vienna, Austria. The school was built to accommodate the children of United Nations (UN) employees and diplomats when the UN decided to locate one of its offices in Vienna (at the Vienna International Centre), and it remains affiliated to the UN. About 50% of students are children of UN employees and receive education grants, while much of the remaining students are children mainly of embassy staff and company staff. The school has an enrollment of 1400 students, from pre-primary to twelfth grade.

History

International Community School
The first English language medium school in Vienna was set up in August 1955 as the International Community School. Previously, it had been the 'British Army School' in Schönbrunn barracks and catered for the children of the British occupying forces in Vienna. The Austrian State Treaty signed in May 1955 resulted in the occupying forces leaving Austria, so the school transformed into the International Community School under the patronage of the British, American and Indian Missions.

It opened on 1 September 1955 in the 18th district of Vienna. By the end of the year, 150 students between the ages of 3 and 15 years attended the International Community School. Soon the building proved too small for the expanding school, which moved into the 19th district. By 1959, 300 children represented 25 different nationalities in ICS. However, most of the children were American or Canadian, so the British and Indian Embassies started a separate British style school in 1959, the English School, while the ICS changed into the American International School.

English School
The English School moved into Grinzinger Straße 95, a premises found with the help of the British Ambassador, Sir James Bowker, the legal advisor at the Embassy Walter Rhodes, and Vienna's Deputy Lord Mayor, Hans Mandl. The English School quickly expanded and was visited by the British Minister of Education in 1961. Some of the first staff of the International Atomic Energy Agency sent their children to the English School in 1959. The school year 1961-62 saw the introduction of William Kirk as director. In May 1969, Queen Elizabeth II and Prince Philip visited the English School on a state visit to Vienna. In 1974, some families of the United Nations Industrial Development Organization (UNIDO) started sending their children to the school.

Vienna International School
In September 1977, Maurice Pezet was invited by the Austrian Government to start the project of developing a Vienna International School on the model of the Geneva and New York United Nations Schools in preparation for the expansion of the United Nations to Vienna. {Vienna is one of the four headquarters of the UN, along with New York, Geneva and Nairobi. The Vienna International Centre (UNO City) is leased to the United Nations for 1 Austrian schilling (7 euro cent) per year.} It was anticipated that there would be two years of preparation for the small existing English School to be incorporated into the school development plan for the Vienna International School (VIS).

The Vienna International School officially opened its doors on 11 September 1978 to pupils of 60 nationalities. Primary and Secondary were accommodated on Grinzingerstrasse and Kindergarten was located on Heiligenstädter Strasse. A part of Secondary moved briefly to Zollergasse and then Schloss Pötzleinsdorf. A year later, Secondary School moved to Peter-Jordan-Straße, where it remained until the custom built present campus was opened in September 1984 with Maurice Pezet as Director. The then Chancellor, Dr Bruno Kreisky had initiated the idea of a new, specially built school and the campus was entirely funded by the Austrian Government. Dr. Kreisky employed Maurice Pezet, formerly associated with the UN School in New York (UNIS), to manage the project and he became the first Director of the new Vienna International School. Dr. Kreisky was present at some of the opening events at the VIS. The new building was constructed in the 22nd District, two U-Bahn (underground) stops from the VIC, and opened in September 1984. It is located on Straße der Menschenrechte, two hundred metres away from the U1 Kagran underground station and the Donau Zentrum Shopping Mall.

Facilities
The school is divided into 3 wings. A Primary and Secondary area, an administrative wing and a separate building for Pre-Primary. The school also has an outdoor ecology area. Facilities include:

220-seat theatre (William Kirk Theatre)
Primary and Secondary library (55.000 items)
7 music rooms
3 art studios
3 design laboratories
7 science laboratories
Food Technology Centre
2 product design studios
4 experimental learning spaces (Garden Classrooms)
5 gyms

Outside facilities include:
Panther Sports Dome with workout station and table tennis
2 grass courts
1 large paved court
380 meters athletic track
3 playgrounds
Cycling & Running trail

Modernisations 
The school is recently undergoing a refurbishment project, modernising many parts of the campus. These have included (list not complete):

Secondary Library renovation 2016
Construction of students study lounges 2012
Theatre renovation project 2013
Major investment in bathroom facilities 2010 - 2013
Establishing a pond, May 2010
Upgrading of 2 computer labs, April 2009
Refurbishing the athletics track, May 2008
Upgrading of 6 science labs with a donation from Borealis, July 2008
Preparing an adjacent field to be used for PE lessons, July 2008

School Day
The school day starts at 8:30 for Primary 8:30 for Secondary and ends at 14:55 for the Primary school and at 15:15 for the Secondary school.

The Primary School has 7 periods a day, with a rough 1-hour lunch break at 11:40 - 12:45 and a 20-minute break at 10:00-10:20.

In the Secondary school, there are 8 periods per day, each 40 minutes long, with 2-minute intervals to get from class to class, a 20-minute break at 10:00-10:20 and a 45-minute lunch break from 12:20-13:05.  Grades 6-8 have lunch breaks from 12:21- 13:04 and 9-12's have lunch breaks from 13:04-14:49.For Grade 11/12, some subjects last until 16:00.

Academics
VIS offers all three programs of the International Baccalaureate (IB) - International Baccalaureate Primary Years Programme (IBPYP), International Baccalaureate Middle Years Programme (IBMYP) and the IB Diploma Programme (IBDP). The school has offered the IB Diploma programme since 1984.

Accreditation
The school is an IB World School. It is also accredited by the Council of International Schools (CIS), Eco Schools and Umweltzeichen.

Graduation requirements and courses

For the IB Diploma, students must select one each from the following groups. The following subjects were offered at VIS:

Group 1: Language 1

English A Literature HL & SL
English A Language and Literature HL & SL
German A Literature HL & SL
German A Language and Literature HL & SL
It is also possible to study a privately taught mother tongue as Group 1 language at HL or SL

Group 2: Language 2

English B HL & SL
German B HL & SL
German ab initio SL
French B HL & SL
Spanish B HL & SL

Group 3: Individuals and Society

Economics HL & SL
Geography HL & SL
History HL & SL
Psychology HL & SL
Information technology in a global society (ITGS) HL & SL

Group 4: Experimental Sciences

Biology HL & SL
Chemistry HL & SL
Physics HL & SL
Design Technology HL & SL
Computer Science HL & SL
Environmental Systems and Societies SL (transdisciplinary course)

Group 5: Mathematics

Mathematics AA HL & SL
Mathematical AI HL & SL

Group 6: The Arts

Music HL & SL
Theatre HL & SL
Visual Arts HL & SL
Film HL & SL

Rather than taking an arts course, students may opt to take another subject from Groups 1 to 5 as their 6th subject

Camps & trips
Additionally to one-day excursions starting in Pre-Primary, the school offers yearly whole-grade camps from Grades 2-9 and specialized trips from Grade 10–12.

Grade 2: Applehof
Grade 3: Annaberg
Grade 4: Illmitz
Grade 5: Radstadt "Ski Week"
Grade 6: Hallstatt
Grade 7: Wagrain "Ski week"
Grade 8: Carinthia
Grade 9: Murau
Grade 10: French: Champagne-Ardenne, Humanities: Mauthausen
Grade 11: Spanish: Barcelona, French: Paris, Biology/ESS: Lunz am See, Drama: London, Art: Venice

School magazine
The school magazine is called the Spotlight. It is published four times yearly, with additional issues for student council elections or other special events. A primary school magazine known as The Mole was also started under the guidance of secondary students during the 2012–2013 academic year.

Famous visits
 May 1969: Queen Elizabeth II
19. May 2009: Jane Goodall
15. June 2009: Sr. Lucy Kurien, founder of MAHER
March 2012: Ernst Fuchs, one of the founders and member of the "Vienna School of Fantastic Realism"
23. November 2017: Alexander Van der Bellen - Bundespräsident Österreich (President of Austria)
7. September 2018: Heinz Fischer - ehemaliger Bundespräsident Österreich (President of Austria)
20. May 2022: Sr. Lucy Kurien, founder of MAHER

Athletics

Sports
VIS offers the following teams during the year, in addition to other sports:
Season 1: Soccer, High School Volleyball, Cross Country Running, Rugby
Season 2: Basketball, Alpine Skiing
Season 3: Golf, Track & Field, Middle School Volleyball, Rugby

Conferences
VIS participates in the following athletics conferences:
Danube Valley Athletics Conference (DVAC)
Sports Council of International Schools (SCIS)
Central and Eastern European Schools Association (CEESA)
International Schools Athletic Association (ISAA)

In addition to this, VIS traditionally organizes the annual Hauser Kaibling Race in Haus Im Ennstal between international schools in Austria, Germany and Switzerland.

Charity
The community service programme is part of both the MYP and the IB DP curriculum and requires students to take an active part in the communities in which they live. The emphasis is on developing community awareness and concerns and acquiring the skills to make an effective contribution to society. The school has a strong engagement in local and global charital events.

Maher
One of its main charities is Maher and VIS has been supporting it since 2005.

Project Centipede 
Each year the primary school students collect food, clothing, shoes, toys, school supplies, and toiletries to donate to Project Centipede, which personally distributes the gifts just before the December holidays to the children and their caregivers in Romania, India, Hungary, Ukraine and Austria.

2004 Tsunami Disaster Response
The school responded to the 2004 Boxing Day Tsunami and focused their efforts on helping to rebuild a school in Indonesia which had been hit hard by the disaster.

Fairtrade
VIS also operates a Fairtrade group aiming to promote the purchase of products that tries to guarantee a better return and quality of life for farmers in lesser economically developed countries.

Alumni
There are multiple alumni pages. These include:
a reunion section on the website
a dedicated website
a Facebook page
a Instagram page
There is also a newsletter for Alumni and former students and staff members are able to book a reunion in the building.

Notable alumni
Tobias Ellwood, British politician
Salam Pax, Iraqi blogger

Scouting
Vienna International School is the home of Vienna International Scout Group 88. The Scout group is affiliated to Boy Scouts and Girl Guides of Austria. It is one of a few English-speaking groups in Vienna but the only one within the Austrian Scout Association which is part of the world associations (WAGGGS and WOSM). It was founded in 1980 and was offered as an afternoon free time activity to pupils and students of the VIS of primary and secondary level first. Over the years children from other bilingual schools around joined in. Meanwhile, the scouting meetings happen offsite but the VIS still supports the group and the volunteer leaders team.

References

External links
 History of Vienna International School
 
 Scouting Group Site
 International Schools in Vienna

International schools in Vienna
Private schools in Austria
United Nations schools
International Baccalaureate schools in Austria
Scouting and Guiding in Austria
Educational institutions established in 1959
1959 establishments in Austria